Dunmurry Recreation & Football Club, commonly referred to as Dunmurry Rec, is a Northern Irish, intermediate football club playing in Division 1A of the Northern Amateur Football League. The club currently has two senior men's teams playing in the NAFL as well as a NI Supporters Club and a Golf Society. The club is based in Dunmurry, Belfast, and was formed in 1879. The club plays in the Irish Cup.

Honours

Intermediate honours
Steel & Sons Cup: 1
1998-99
Northern Amateur Football League: 2
1991-92, 1998–99
Border Cup: 2
1991-92, 2006–07

References

External links
  Club website

Association football clubs in Northern Ireland
Association football clubs established in 1879
Association football clubs in Belfast
Northern Amateur Football League clubs